Dissopsalini ("double scissors") is a extinct tribe of teratodontid hyaenodonts. Fossil remains of these mammals are known from early to late Miocene deposits in Asia and Africa.

Classification and phylogeny

Taxonomy
 Tribe: †Dissopsalini 
 Genus: †Buhakia 
 †Buhakia hyaenoides 
 †Buhakia moghraensis 
 †Buhakia sp. I [Karungu, Kenya] 
 †Buhakia sp. II [GSN GT VI 22’17] 
 Genus: †Dissopsalis 
 †Dissopsalis carnifex 
 †Dissopsalis pyroclasticus

Phylogeny
The phylogenetic relationships of tribe Dissopsalini are shown in the following cladogram:

See also
 Mammal classification
 Teratodontidae

References

Hyaenodonts
Miocene mammals of Africa
Miocene mammals of Asia
Mammal tribes